The 2016 Top Music Awards was held at the Pallati i Kongreseve in the capital city of Tirana, Albania, on 25 June 2016 and was broadcast live on Top Channel.
 
Noizy was nominated for five awards followed by Era Istrefi, Elvana Gjata and Kida who were nominated for four awards. Era Istrefi and Alban Skënderaj won three awards, becoming the most awarded artist of the night.

Winners and nominees 

The winners of Top Music Awards 2016 are highlighted in Bold and were announced live in June 2016.

Female Artist of the Year 

 Era Istrefi
 Elvana Gjata
 Kida
 Enca
 Nora Istrefi

Male Artist of the Year 

 Alban Skënderaj 
 Ledri Vula
 Flori Mumajesi
 Noizy
 Capital T

Group of the Year 

 NRG Band 
 Asgjë Sikur Dielli
 Troja
 Kaos

Video of the Year 

 Capital T—"Hitman" 
 Ledri Vula—"Kings" 
 MC Kresha—"Era" 
 Troja—"A E Man N'Men" 
 Dafina Zeqiri feat. Mixey—"Liri"

Avantgarde Artist 
 MC Kresha
 Era Istrefi
 Noizy
 Edona Vatoci

Song of the Year 
 
 Era Istrefi—"BonBon" 
 Majk feat. Ghetto Geasy—"S'Jena Mo"
 Elvana Gjata feat. Bruno—"Love Me"
 Era Istrefi feat. Ledri Vula—"Shume Pis"
 Noizy—"Number One"
 Mozzik feat. Kida–"Premtimet"
 2 Ton—"Ani Nasht"
 2po2 feat. Flori Mumajesi—"Gone Girl"
 MC Kresha—"Era" 
 Alban Skënderaj—"Unë Dhe Ti"

References 

 
top channel
June 2016 events in Europe
2016 in Albanian music